KSUR (630 kHz) is a commercial AM radio station licensed to Monterey, California.  KSUR serves the Monterey Bay and Santa Cruz area. The station is owned by Mount Wilson Broadcasting and currently broadcasts an oldies radio format.

KSUR broadcasts at 1,000 watts, using a directional antenna to protect other stations on 630 AM from interference. In addition, it broadcasts on FM translator K294CA at 106.7 MHz.

History
In 1955, the station first signed on as KXXL. It was owned by Pacific Ventures, Inc. The station was later owned by Robert Sherry and his wife Julie Conway. Sherry owned and managed the station until Walton Broadcasting bought it in the mid-1970s. Sherry had been an NBC staff announcer in New York. Conway was an entertainer who had a million-selling record, "Jingle Jangle Jingle." Walton, owner of several stations in the Southwest, brought Claude D. Barnett to Monterey. Walton had to surrender the license of KIKX, Tucson, Arizona, to the FCC after his staff staged a phony kidnapping as a ratings stunt.

For many years, KIDD offered an adult standards/MOR format, using the name "Magic 63". On April 7, 2009, the station shifted to an oldies playlist comprising a wide range of mid-1950s to 1970s pop songs. This was prompted by KOMY's dropping of the oldies format. The morning hours were hosted by Kevin Kahl, who had been an on-air voice for "Magic 63". Weekend host Ed Dickinson's long-running "Way Back Now" music-nostalgia program survived the format change for two additional years before being canceled in late May 2011. At the time of its shutdown in 2014, the station was carrying the ESPN Radio Network.

Structural problems with the station's towers at Reservation Road and Seaside Court prompted owner Buckley Broadcasting to take KIDD silent on December 31, 2014. The towers, more than 50 years old and badly rusted, were dismantled. Buckley (already liquidating its other assets) put the license up for sale. In April 2015, KIDD was purchased by Saul Levine's Mount Wilson FM Broadcasters, owner of Monterey station KBOQ and Los Angeles stations KKGO, KMZT, and KMZT-FM. Because the original tower site is now a protected wetlands, Levine erected a new transmitting facility in Marina, California. The sale of KIDD was consummated on July 31, 2015, at a purchase price of $50,000.

On October 23, 2015, KIDD returned to the air with a classical music format. It is operating under FCC special temporary authority at the KNRY tower, which is quite short for 630 kHz and nondirectional. At the previous site, KIDD was licensed with two directional patterns to protect 620 kHz in Hanford. It can't be permanently licensed as nondirectional.

In November 2019, Levine donated KIDD to The Balanced Radio Foundation, a nonprofit broadcasting company incorporated October 7 in Foresthill, California, but the donation was never consummated.

In April 2020, KIDD went silent. On November 12, 2021, Mount Wilson FM changed the station call sign to KSUR and returned to the air in December 2021 with an oldies format.

Past personalities
KIDD's glory days were the 1960s and rose back to the top of the Arbitron ratings in the early 1980s with a Top 40 format. KIDD remained a driving force in Monterey radio until 1985. In 1985, while facing strong competition from FM stations, under the direction of General Manager Claude D. Barnett, KIDD fired the entire air staff and joined a growing movement at the time in radio by switching to satellite programming. Many of the Central Coast's top personalities worked there, including Dave Andrews (the son of movie star Dana Andrews), Dave Bennett, Buck Buchanan, Byng Robbins, Phil Keller and Rob Mahr. Others appearing on KIDD include Jack Paar, Anthony Mafazolli, Jerry Teal, Ed Dickinson, Nick Souza, Sloan "Not So Loud the Neighbors Will Hear Us" Brown, Eileen Cashman, news stringer Jerry, Gene Rusco of KGO fame, and Rich Dixon who had a brief run at KGO in the late 1980s. Art Bell was on KIDD, when he lived in the Monterey area in the 1970s. Sean "Hollywood" Hamilton also spent some time on KIDD before moving on to Z-100 in New York and KIIS-FM in Los Angeles.

References

External links
FCC History Cards for KSUR
Ed Dickenson, Host of Way Back Now

SUR
Radio stations established in 1955
1955 establishments in California
Oldies radio stations in the United States